Bigler can refer to:

People with the surname
Chris Bigler, poker player
Erin Bigler (born 1949), American neuropsychologist
 Heinz Bigler (footballer, born 1925) (1925–2002), Swiss football midfielder and manager
 Heinz Bigler (footballer, born 1949), Swiss football defender and manager
Ivan Bigler (1892–1975), American baseball player
John Bigler, California governor
Kevin Bigler (born 1992), Swiss footballer
Milo Bigler (born 1914), Swiss skeleton racer
William Bigler, Pennsylvania governor

Places
Bigler Township, Clearfield County, Pennsylvania
Bigler, Pennsylvania, a census-designated place in Bradford Township, Clearfield County, Pennsylvania, United States
Bigler Nunataks, a cluster of nunataks in Oates Land, Antarctica